So Much for the Afterglow is the third studio album by American alternative rock band Everclear, released on October 7, 1997, through Capital Records. It contained the singles "Everything to Everyone", "I Will Buy You a New Life", "Father of Mine", "So Much for the Afterglow", and "One Hit Wonder". "Everything to Everyone", "I Will Buy You A New Life", and "Father of Mine" received heavy rotation on MTV's Total Request Live and launched Everclear into mainstream popularity in the late-90s. So Much for the Afterglow provided Everclear with their only Grammy nomination to date, a Best Rock Instrumental nod in 1998 for "El Distorto de Melodica." The album is considered a departure from the band's earlier punk rock and grunge sound for a more pop-oriented sound.

So Much for the Afterglow remains Everclear's best selling album with a 2× Platinum certification by the RIAA in 1998.

Production
It was originally going to be called Pure White Evil, however, the title was changed to So Much for the Afterglow in March 1997.

Early on, singer Art Alexakis wanted to create "a combination of even heavier songs, more punk songs, and then kind of more melodic stuff." By the time touring for Sparkle and Fade ended and recording began, the direction of the album shifted. Alexakis remarked to MTV that, "the fact is, Sparkle and Fade was a rock record with pop influences; this time we tried to make a pop record with rock influences." Regarding the recording process, Greg Eklund reflected, "We rented a room in a warehouse, oddly enough by Esco Steel, where I used to work, in Northwest Portland. We were literally around the corner from where I used to work in a steel foundry. I don't know how we found it, but it was in a really dilapidated warehouse down there. And Craig got, like, shingles and some weird flu that put him in the hospital or something. So I remember when we started working on Art's new songs it was just him and me." He also noted there was pressure to follow up the success of the song "Santa Monica", commenting "We'd had some success with "Santa Monica" but there was a really big question mark whether we'd be able to continue that. You know what everybody says—you have 10 years to write your first record and six months to write your second. Art was a good songwriter, so I knew we had good songs, but it was sorta like, 'Wow, if this doesn't go, this might all end right here.'"

Pro Tools were utilized during the recording, including on the song "El Distorto de Melodica", which was composed in Pro Tools by associate producer Lars Fox, using techniques he'd developed while with his band, Grotus. On earlier Everclear releases, Alexakis sped up the tapes of songs to make them faster and more energetic. Due to Pro Tools, he was able to speed up songs without having his pitch altered. Fox recalled that "Everything to Everyone" was sped up by ten percent. He remarked, "If he'd sung it and sped it up that much he'd sound like Mickey Mouse. He'd sound like a chipmunk. So he sung it with the track already sped up some percentage."

The final mixes for So Much for the Afterglow were completed in June 1997.

Promotion
Following a run of shows in the US during late 1997, Everclear had a troubled tour of Australia, which saw the band temporarily break up, with bassist Craig Montoya eventually leaving the tour. At the time, MTV News stated, "Media reports from down under reveal that Montoya's bass was stolen at the Extreme Games concert on the Gold Coast; a firecracker or pipe bomb was thrown on the stage in Melbourne; and that Alexakis was hit in the face by a shoe in Wollongong. [Australian music industry columnist Christie] Eliezer's column also reports that following the theft of the guitar, Alexakis swore at the audience." Alexakis later claimed the behaviour of the Australian fans didn't lead to friction, saying "The problem wasn't with me. The problem was that the other people were having a hard time. Look, I love Australia! Especially Melbourne. Every time I go down there, I almost don't wanna come back. I love it there." Eklund also elaborated, "That's complete bullshit. That's a retelling of what happened. I love Australia, too. It's one of my favorite places in the world. That's not what happened."

Reception
So Much for the Afterglow received a mostly positive reaction from critics. The Orlando Sentinel observed in their review that, "It almost seems that Everclear is writing a soundtrack for their lives by singing about the 'girl next door', poverty, egotistical snobs and a father who abandons his family. Though Everclear does tackle some depressing subjects, their songs don't become Pearl Jam-like depress-fests because of the band's positive outlook and upbeat music." Spin claimed the album explored "oddly grown-up topics for alt-rock", also noting similarities with the band's previous work, stating "On Sparkle and Fade, the centerpieces 'Santa Monica' and 'Summerland' deal expressly with escaping to begin a new life in a new place, west of here, beside the ocean if at all possible. Now in 'Amphetamine', Miss Perfect-in-a-Fucked-Up-Way comes 'out West to find the sun'". Rolling Stone gave the album a mixed review, stating "the songs on So Much for the Afterglow manage only to present a series of victims, objects of leadman Art Alexakis' confused contempt or peculiarly mopey brand of compassion: the neglectful ne'er-do-well of 'Father of Mine'; the people-pleasing nymphet of the first single, 'Everything to Everyone'; the two-dimensional 'magazine girl' of 'Amphetamine'. Alexakis seems incapable of irony, depicting these people in a manner that's never less than heavy-handed."

Legacy and accolades
The New York Times included So Much for the Afterglow on their "Best of '97" list in January 1998, writing "With loud, obnoxious songs that confront the crisis of the family, monogamy's perils and the vise grip of money, from the perspective of a punk trying not to self-destruct for a change, Everclear is perfecting rebel rock for adults." In 2017, The Dallas Morning News included So Much for the Afterglow in an article titled "Flash back to 1997: 5 albums that were as good 20 years ago as they are today", noting that it took the band from "one-hit wonder to modern rock headliner."

Everclear toured the US and Australia in 2017 to celebrate the album's 20th anniversary.

Track listing

Personnel
Band
 Art Alexakis - Banjo, Guitar, Mandolin, Piano, Steel guitar, Keyboards, Vocals, Producer, Vocal Arrangement, Horn Arrangements, String Arrangements, Cover Art Concept, Cover Design, Toy piano & Moog 
 Greg Eklund - Percussion, Drums, Keyboards, Vocals, Assistant Producer, Slide whistle
 Craig Montoya - Mandolin, Bass guitar, Keyboards, Sound Effects, Vocals, Assistant Producer

Additional musicians
 Paul Cantelon - Violin
 Derron Nuhfer - Saxophone
 Buddy Schaub - Trombone
 Gerri Sutyak - Cello
 Rami Jaffee - Vox Organ

Production
 Neal Avron - Trumpet, Producer, Engineer, Vocal Arrangement, Horn Arrangements, Mixing
 Tom Banghart - Assistant Engineer
 Mike Baumgartner - Assistant Engineer
 Steven Birch - Coordination, Art Direction, Design, Cover Art Concept, Cover Design
 Ian Blanch - Mixing Assistant
 Nick Brophy - Assistant Engineer
 Lars Fox - Sampling, Loops, Assistant Producer
 Dave Friedlander - Assistant Engineer
 Krista Gaylor - Photography
 Bill Jackson - Assistant Engineer
 Bob Ludwig - Mastering
 Frank Ockenfels - Photography, Cover Art
 Ronnie Rivera - Assistant Engineer
 Jim Rondinelli - Engineer, String Arrangements, Assistant Producer
 Kenneth A. Van Druten - Assistant Engineer
 Andy Wallace - Mixing
 Perry Watts-Russell - Executive Producer
 Joe Zook - Editing, Editing Assistant, Transfer Assistant

Charts

Weekly charts

Year-end charts

Certifications

References

Everclear (band) albums
1997 albums
Capitol Records albums
Albums produced by Neal Avron
Albums produced by Art Alexakis
Albums produced by Lars Fox